Naldurg is a town and a municipal council in Osmanabad district in the Indian state of Maharashtra.

Geography
The temperature ranges from 10.1 °C to 43.1 °C, and the average yearly rainfall is 760mm.

Demographics
 India census, Naldurg had a population of 18,341. Males constitute 52% of the population and females 48%. Naldurg has an average literacy rate of 84.10%, higher than the state average of 82.34%. Male literacy is 90%, and female literacy is 78%. In Naldurg, 15% of the population is under 6 years of age. Schedule Caste (SC) constitutes 11.61% while Schedule Tribe (ST) were 0.95% of total population in Naldurg.

See also
 Naldurg Fort

References

Cities and towns in Osmanabad district